Calanthe sylvatica is a species of orchid. It is native to tropical and southern Africa from Sierra Leone to Tanzania to South Africa, as well as Madagascar, Comoros, Mauritius and Réunion.

References

External links

sylvatica
Orchids of Africa
Orchids of Madagascar
Flora of the Comoros
Orchids of Réunion
Flora of Mauritius
Plants described in 1822